Bråskov is a very small village in East Jutland approximately  from Horsens, close to Hornsyld. Bråskov is located in Hedensted Municipality and belongs to the Central Denmark Region.

References

Towns and settlements in Hedensted Municipality